Franco Agamenone was the defending champion but chose not to defend his title.

Oleksii Krutykh won the title after defeating Lucas Gerch 6–3, 6–7(2–7), 6–2 in the final.

Seeds

Draw

Finals

Top half

Bottom half

References

External links
Main draw
Qualifying draw

IBG Prague Open - 1